Graham Edward Hamer (born 9 November 1936) is a former New Zealand rugby union coach.

Hamer started his senior coaching career with the Kia Toa club in 1973.

He then notably coached the  provincial side to their only Ranfurly Shield reign (between 1976 and 1977) as well as winning the only first division in the union's history (1980).

A trophy dedicated to Hamer, the Graham Hamer Trophy, is competed for at the Central Region sevens annually.

References 

New Zealand rugby union coaches
Living people
1936 births